This bibliography of Theodore Roosevelt is a list of published works about Theodore Roosevelt, the 26th president of the United States. The titles are selected from tens of thousands of publications about him.

Full biographies
 
 .
 
 .
 .
 , 105 pp, very short biography by leading scholar.
 .
 .
 ; Pulitzer prize for Volume 1.
 
 
 .
 , only volume published, to age 28.
 .
 .

Personality and activities
 .
 .
  Provides a lesson plan on TR as the historical figure who most exemplifies the quality of masculinity.
 
 . Chronicles the events of TR's presidency during the summers of his two terms.
 Goodwin, Doris Kearns. The Bully Pulpit: Theodore Roosevelt, William Howard Taft, and the Golden Age of Journalism (2013)

 . The president's use of publicity, rhetoric and force of personality.
 ; his deadly 1913–14 trip to the Amazon.
 , best seller; to 1886.
 , to 1884.
 . 494 pp.
 , examines TR and his family during the World War I period.
 .
 , 240 pp. TR in Africa & Europe, 1909–10
  208 pp. A look at TR's formative years.
 . 289 pp.
 , 337 pp; TR's political thought and its significance for republican self-government.

Domestic policies
 online review; another online review
 Cutright, P.R. (1985) Theodore Roosevelt: The making of a Modern Conservationist (U of Illinois Press.)
 .
 , standard history of his domestic and foreign policy as president.
 Bakari, Mohamed El-Kamel. "Mapping the ‘Anthropocentric-ecocentric’Dualism in the History of American Presidency: The Good, the Bad, and the Ambivalent." Journal of Studies in Social Sciences 14, no. 2 (2016).
 .
 .
 Redekop, Benjamin. (2015). "Embodying the Story: The Conservation Leadership of Theodore Roosevelt".  Leadership (2015) DOI:10.1177/1742715014546875  online
 .
 .

Politics
 . How TR did politics.
 , 323 pp.

 .
 .
 .
 .
 
 . 361 pp.
 .
 . Focus on 1912
 .
 . Attacks TR policies from conservative/libertarian perspective.

Foreign and military affairs
 . online
 Burton, D. H. "Theodore Roosevelt and the Special Relationship with Britain" History Today (Aug 1973), Vol. 23 Issue 8, pp 527–535 online.
 Coletta, Paolo E. “The Diplomacy of Theodore Roosevelt and William Howard Taft.” In American Foreign Relations: A Historiographical Review, edited by Gerald K. Haines and Samuel J. Walker, 91-114. (Westport, CT: Greenwood Press, 1981).
 
 .
 . 328 pp.
 
 .
 .
 . On TR's controversial reforms.
 .
 .
 .
 .
 .
 Thompson, John M. (2019) Great Power Rising: Theodore Roosevelt and the Politics of US Foreign Policy (Oxford UP, 2019).
 
 . 196 pp.
 Wimmel, Kenneth. Theodore Roosevelt and the Great White Fleet: American Seapower Comes of Age (Potomac Books, 1998), popular history

Historiography
 Dalton, Kathleen. "Changing interpretations of Theodore Roosevelt and the Progressive era." in Christopher M. Nichols and Nancy C. Unger, eds A Companion to the Gilded Age and Progressive Era (2017): 296–307.
 Grantham, Dewey W., Jr. "Theodore Roosevelt in American Historical Writing, 1945–1960." Mid-America 43#1 (January 1961): 3–35.
 Ricard, Serge. "The State of Theodore Roosevelt Studies" H-Diplo Essay No. 116 24 October 2014 online
 , excerpt and text search, 28 new essays by scholars; focus on historiography. online
 Tilchin, William, "The Rising Star of Theodore Roosevelt's Diplomacy: Major Studies from Beale to the Present." Theodore Roosevelt Association Journal 15#3 (Summer 1989):2–24.

Primary sources

"The Complete Works of Theodore Roosevelt  (2017) 4500 pages in Kindle format  ($1)  online at Amazon

 Kohn, Edward P., ed. A Most Glorious Ride: The Diaries of Theodore Roosevelt, 1877–1886'' (State University of New York Press, 2015), 284 pp.
 ; vol 2
 
 
 .
 .
 
 , 20 vol.; 18,000 pages containing most of TR's speeches, books and essays, but not his letters; a CD-ROM edition is available; some of TR's books are available online through Project Bartleby
 , Roosevelt's opinions on many issues; online version at Theodore Roosevelt.
 , 8 vols. Very large.
 .
 
 .
 .
 
 .
 .
 
 .

Notes

Bibliographies of presidents of the United States
Books about politics of the United States
Political bibliographies
Bibliographies of people